Johan Undrum  (7 October 1880 – 14 March 1940) was a Norwegian politician.

He was born in Våle to Christian Gerhard Undrum and Hanna Mathilde Olsen. He was elected representative to the Storting for several periods, 1931–1945, for the Conservative Party.

References

1880 births
1940 deaths
People from Re, Norway
Conservative Party (Norway) politicians
Members of the Storting